is a Japanese visual kei rock/metal musician, best known as  the guitarist and main composer for the now disbanded D'espairsRay. He is now in Angelo, which he joined in 2011.

Biography

Early life
During middle school Karyu's father gave him an electric guitar and taught him how to play; this was the start of his interest in music. While in high school he started to search for band mates, and eventually formed the short lived Dieur Mind. They performed Boøwy covers, until recording their demo tape "Message". But by then Karyu, who at the time went by the name Yoshitaka, was threatening to disband. On Dieur Mind's last tour Karyu randomly met Zero and his band at that time. After dining together they had found they shared the same goals. Later Karyu went and saw Le'Viel, Hizumi and Tsukasa's band. Karyu was so impressed by their performance that he asked Hizumi to join him, but he declined until Le'Viel had broken up. Karyu finally met Tsukasa after Hizumi suggested him for the band. Eventually, Karyu called Zero, Hizumi, and Tsukasa one day to record a demo tape; that being the birth of D'espairsRay.

Post D'espairsRay; Luv Parade and Angelo
After D'espairsRay disbanded on June 15, 2011, Karyu along with Zero and Tsukasa, participated in Luv Parade, a live session band, with defspiral singer Taka.

In August 2011, it was announced that Karyu, and Giru (ex:Vidoll), had joined Kirito, Kohta and Takeo (all three ex:Pierrot) in Angelo.

References

External links
 Signature ESP guitar

Living people
Industrial musicians
Visual kei musicians
Japanese heavy metal guitarists
Japanese rock guitarists
Musicians from Yamaguchi Prefecture
20th-century Japanese guitarists
21st-century Japanese guitarists
20th-century Japanese male musicians
21st-century Japanese male musicians
1978 births